Flora Iranica is a series of books on the flora of Iranian highlands and adjacent mountains in Iran, Afghanistan, Pakistan, Iraq, Azerbaijan and Turkmenistan. The general editor of the series is the Austrian botanist Karl Heinz Rechinger.

References 

Florae (publication)
Botany in Asia
Publications established in 2015